In 1964, the United States FBI, under Director J. Edgar Hoover, continued for a fifteenth year to maintain a public list of the people it regarded as the Ten Most Wanted Fugitives.

As the year 1964 began, nine of the ten places on the list remained filled by these elusive long-time fugitives from prior years, then still at large:

 1950 #14 (fourteen years), Frederick J. Tenuto process dismissed March 9, 1964
 1956 #97 (eight years), Eugene Francis Newman remained still at large
 1960 #137 (four years), Donald Leroy Payne remained still at large
 1961 #158 (three years), John Gibson Dillon found murdered March 2, 1964
 1962 #170 (two years), Edward Howard Maps remained still at large
 1963 #175 (one year), Harold Thomas O'Brien remained still at large
 1963 #178 (one year), Howard Jay Barnard arrested April 6, 1964
 1963 #181 (three months), Thomas Asbury Hadder arrested January 13, 1964
 1963 #182 (one year), Alfred Oponowicz captured December 23, 1964

By year end, despite the nearly full list it began the year with, the FBI again had a very productive year of new captures, and added a total of an additional nineteen new Fugitives.

Also notable in 1964 was the removal from the list of the Fugitive with the longest time ever spent on the list up to that time, Fugitive #14, Frederick J. Tenuto, who had been listed in the very first year of the first top Ten, although he was not an original Top Tenner. Tenuto's record of fourteen years on the list would not be surpassed until several decades later.

1964 fugitives
The "Ten Most Wanted Fugitives" listed by the FBI in 1964 include (in FBI list appearance sequence order):

Jesse James Gilbert
January 27, 1964 #184
One month on the list
Jesse James Gilbert - U.S. prisoner arrested February 26, 1964 in Philadelphia, Pennsylvania by FBI Agents. In order to hide his identity, he was wearing a wig, had on dark glasses, and had placed bandages over a tattoo on his left arm. After being apprehended by the Agents, Gilbert remarked, "You men are real gentlemen, and if I had to be picked up I'm glad it was by the FBI."

Sammie Earl Ammons
February 10, 1964 #185
Three months on the list
Sammie Earl Ammons - U.S. prisoner arrested May 15, 1964 in Cherokee, Alabama by local police after a high-speed chase as local authorities pursued him across the state line after he attempted to pass a bad check in a Rome, Georgia store

Frank B. Dumont
March 10, 1964 #186
One month on the list
Frank B. Dumont - U.S. prisoner arrested April 27, 1964 in Tucson, Arizona by local police after committing a burglary in an apartment building

William Beverly Hughes
March 18, 1964 #187
One month on the list
William Beverly Hughes - U.S. prisoner arrested April 11, 1964 in Bylas, Arizona by the Arizona Highway Patrol after a citizen recognized him from a description reported in a newspaper article

Quay Cleon Kilburn
March 23, 1964 #188
Three months on the list
Quay Cleon Kilburn - U.S. prisoner arrested June 25, 1964 in Ogden, Utah; 2nd appearance on the list, was also Fugitive #105, arrested in Los Angeles, California June 2, 1958 FBI Special Agent Lewis Libby arrested Kilburn while staking out a boarding house where Kilburn was thought to be hiding out.

Joseph Francis Bryan, Jr.
April 14, 1964 #189
Two weeks on the list
Joseph Francis Bryan, Jr. - U.S. prisoner arrested April 28, 1964 in New Orleans, Louisiana.

John Robert Bailey
April 22, 1964 #190
Two weeks on the list
John Robert Bailey - U.S. prisoner arrested May 4, 1964 in Hayward, California where he had posed as a plumber for
two years.

George Zavada
May 6, 1964 #191
One month on the list
George Zavada - U.S. prisoner arrested June 12, 1964 in San Jose, California after a gun battle in which he was
shot in the chest and rushed to a hospital in Santa Clara to undergo surgery

George Patrick McLaughlin
May 8, 1964 #192
Nine months on the list
George Patrick McLaughlin - U.S. prisoner arrested February 24, 1965 in Dorchester, Massachusetts in his third floor apartment

Chester Collins
May 14, 1964 #193
Three years on the list
Chester Collins - process dismissed March 30, 1967 in West Palm Beach, Florida at the request of local authorities

Edward Newton Nivens
May 28, 1964 #194
Five days on the list
Edward Newton Nivens - U.S. prisoner arrested June 2, 1964 in Tampa, Florida by the FBI after a citizen recognized
him from a wanted flyer

Louis Frederick Vasselli
June 15, 1964 #195
Three months on the list
Louis Frederick Vasselli - U.S. prisoner arrested September 1, 1964 in Calumet City, Illinois by the FBI after an old schoolmate recognized him from a wanted flyer

Thomas Edward Galloway
June 24, 1964 #196
One month on the list
Thomas Edward Galloway - U.S. prisoner arrested July 17, 1964 at a golf course in Danville, Virginia by the FBI after a
citizen recognized him from a newspaper article

Alson Thomas Wahrlich
July 9, 1964 #197
Three years on the list
Alson Thomas Wahrlich - U.S. prisoner arrested October 28, 1967 in Treasure Island, Florida after a citizen recognized his
description in Argosy magazine

Kenneth Malcolm Christiansen
July 27, 1964 #198
Two months on the list
Kenneth Malcolm Christiansen - U.S. prisoner arrested September 8, 1964 in Silver Spring, Maryland by local authorities after attempting to rob a seafood restaurant

William Hutton Coble
September 11, 1964 #199
Six months on the list
William Hutton Coble - U.S. prisoner arrested March 1, 1965 in Charlotte, North Carolina by Charlotte police after an
unsuccessful attempt to rob a bank

Lloyd Donald Greeson, Jr.
September 18, 1964 #200
One week on the list
Lloyd Donald Greeson, Jr. - U.S. prisoner arrested September 23, 1964 in Lake Elsinore, California by the Chief of Police after a citizen recognized him from a photograph on the wanted flyer

Raymond Lawrence Wyngaard
October 5, 1964 #201
One month on the list
Raymond Lawrence Wyngaard - U.S. prisoner arrested November 28, 1964 in a taxi cab in downtown Madison, Wisconsin

Norman Belyea Gorham
December 10, 1964 #202
Five months on the list
Norman Belyea Gorham - U.S. prisoner arrested May 27, 1965 in Los Angeles, California after a citizen recognized him
from a television announcement

See also

Later entries
FBI Ten Most Wanted Fugitives, 2020s
FBI Ten Most Wanted Fugitives, 2010s
FBI Ten Most Wanted Fugitives, 2000s
FBI Ten Most Wanted Fugitives, 1990s
FBI Ten Most Wanted Fugitives, 1980s
FBI Ten Most Wanted Fugitives, 1970s
FBI Ten Most Wanted Fugitives, 1960s

Prior entries
FBI Ten Most Wanted Fugitives, 1950s

References

External links
Current FBI top ten most wanted fugitives at FBI site
FBI pdf source document listing all Ten Most Wanted year by year (removed by FBI)

 
1964 in the United States